Gol Shaneh (also Romanized as Gol Shāneh) is a village in Dastgerdan Rural District, Dastgerdan District, Tabas County, South Khorasan Province, Iran. At the 2006 census, its population was 55, in 26 families.

References 

Populated places in Tabas County